Raja Ki Chandni (English: Raja's Chandni) is a 2019 Pakistani romantic comedy television film aired on Hum TV during August 2019. The film was written by Adam Azeem, developed by Shahzad Javed, Head of Content, HUM TV and Directed by Kamran Akbar Khan. The telefilm is produced by Momina Duraid under MD Productions. It features Kubra Khan and Mohsin Abbas Haider in leads while Behroze Sabzwari, Khalid Anam and Mariam Mirza in supporting roles.

Cast
Kubra Khan as Chandni
Mohsin Abbas Haider as Raja
Behroze Sabzwari as Raja's father
Khalid Anam as Chandni's father
Mariam Mirza as Raja's mother

References 

Pakistani television films
2019 romantic comedy films
2019 films
2010s Urdu-language films